sfdisk is a Linux partition editor. In contrast to fdisk and cfdisk, sfdisk is not interactive. All three programs are written in C and are part of the util-linux package of Linux utility programs.

Since sfdisk is command-driven instead of menu-driven, i.e., it reads input from standard input or from a file, it is generally used for partitioning drives from scripts or used by programs, like e.g. KDE Partition Manager.

The current sfdisk implementation uses the libfdisk library. sfdisk supports MBR (DOS), GPT, SUN and SGI disk labels, but it no longer provides any functionality for CHS (Cylinder-Head-Sector) addressing since version 2.26.

See also
 format
 gpart
 parted, GParted
 diskpart
 List of disk partitioning software

References

External links
Manual
Debian Package
sfdisk(8) - Linux man page

 Free partitioning software
 Linux file system-related software